Jarrad Paul (born June 20, 1976) is an American screenwriter, director, and actor.

Early life and education
Paul grew up in Miami, Florida. After graduating from high school, he moved to Los Angeles.

Career
Paul co-created and executive produced the Fox comedy The Grinder starring Rob Lowe and Fred Savage.  He also co-wrote and co-directed The D Train starring Jack Black and James Marsden, which was purchased at the 2015 Sundance Film Festival by IFC. During the 1990s Paul had a role on Seinfeld, Home Improvement as Jason and a recurring role in the 2000s on Monk. In 1999, he co-starred with Jay Mohr in Action as screenwriter Adam Rafkin.

Films he has appeared in include 40 Days and 40 Nights, The Shaggy Dog, and Yes Man, which he also co-wrote.

Filmography

Films

TV series

Writer

References

External links 

Jarrad Paul Profile: Biography, Filmography & Photos - Yahoo! Movies UK

1976 births
American male film actors
Living people
American male television actors
American male screenwriters
American television writers
American male television writers